Oksana Vasylivna Koliada (born 4 September 1980) is a Ukrainian law enforcement officer and politician. On 29 August 2019, she was appointed as the Minister of Temporarily Occupied Territories, IDPs and veterans.

Biography 
From 2016 to 2017, she studied at the Ivan Chernyakhovsky National Defense University of Ukraine. 

From 2003 to 2015, she worked at the Ministry of the Interior.

From 2015 to 2017, Koliada served in the Armed Forces of Ukraine. She was the head of the Communications and Press Department of the Ministry of Defence.

From March 2019, she worked as Deputy Minister of Veterans Affairs.

Colonel of the Reserve.

See also 
 Honcharuk Government

References

External links 
 Ministry for Veterans Affairs (in Ukrainian)

1980 births
Living people
People from Volochysk
Ivan Chernyakhovsky National Defense University of Ukraine alumni
Ukrainian female military personnel
Ukrainian colonels
Women in 21st-century warfare
Ukrainian women activists
Ministry for Veterans Affairs of Ukraine
Women government ministers of Ukraine
21st-century Ukrainian women politicians
21st-century Ukrainian politicians
Temporarily occupied territories and IDPs ministers of Ukraine